Events from the year 1867 in Ireland.

Events 
 11 February – abortive Fenian attempt to seize Chester Castle.
 5 March – Fenian Rising in County Dublin, County Cork, County Limerick, County Tipperary and County Clare.
 12 July – despite the Party Processions Acts, the Orange Order parades from Bangor to Newtownards in County Down. It is organised by William Johnston (sentenced to a short term in prison the next year for his actions) and about 30,000 take part.
 August – Irish Republican Brotherhood convention at Manchester appoints Colonel Thomas J. Kelly to succeed James Stephens.
 11 September – Thomas J. Kelly and Timothy Deasy are arrested in Manchester.
 18 September – rescue of Kelly and Deasy from a police van in Manchester; one policeman is shot.
 12 October – 62 Fenians are among the last group of convicts to suffer penal transportation as the convict ship Hougoumont departs from Portsmouth on an 89-day passage to Western Australia.
 23 November – William Allen, Michael Larkin and Michael O'Brien, the 'Manchester Martyrs', are hanged in Salford for their part in the rescue of Kelly and Deasy.
 13 December – Clerkenwell explosion at Clerkenwell Prison in London during a Fenian escape attempt; 12 local residents are killed.
 Royal Irish Constabulary granted its "Royal" prefix by Queen Victoria.

Births 
 1 January – Thomas Westropp Bennett, Cumann na nGaedheal member of the Seanad, Cathaoirleach of Seanad (died 1962).
 25 January – Dolway Walkington, Irish national rugby union captain (died 1926).
 9 February – James Douglas, journalist (died 1940).
 10 April – George William Russell, critic, poet and artist (died 1935).
 19 April – James Cullen, priest and mathematician (died 1933).
 13 May – Thomas Gann, doctor, archaeologist and writer (died 1938).

 15 May – Eoin MacNeill, scholar, nationalist and revolutionary (died 1945).
 17 June – John Robert Gregg, creator of Gregg Shorthand (died 1948).
 11 August – Martin Morris, 2nd Baron Killanin, barrister and politician (died 1927).
 2 October – James Stevenson-Hamilton, soldier and game warden (died 1957 in South Africa)
 10 November – John Henry Patterson, soldier, hunter and writer (died 1947).
 16 December – Amy Carmichael, Christian missionary and writer (died 1951).
 26 December – Ella Young, poet (died 1956).
 31 December – Seumas MacManus, writer (died 1960).
 Undated – Cathal O'Byrne, singer, poet and writer (died 1957).

Deaths 
 7 February – William Dargan, engineer and railway builder (born 1799).
 22 February – Daniel Devlin, businessman and City Chamberlain in New York (born 1814).
 12 April – Robert Bell, journalist and writer (born 1800).
 20 April – John Lyons, soldier, recipient of the Victoria Cross for gallantry in 1855 at the siege of Sebastopol in the Crimean War (born 1824).
 17 September – Francis Blackburne, Lord Chancellor of Ireland (born 1782).
 23 September – Richard W. Dowling, victorious commander at the Second Battle of Sabine Pass in the American Civil War (born 1838).
 31 October – William Parsons, 3rd Earl of Rosse, astronomer, builder of the "Leviathan of Parsonstown" (born 1800).
 10 December – Edward Whelan, politician, a Father of the Canadian Confederation (born 1824).
 Undated – George Crawford Hyndman, auctioneer and amateur biologist (born 1796).

References 

 
1860s in Ireland
Ireland
Years of the 19th century in Ireland